Annie Else Zaenen (b. 1941, Belgium) is an adjunct professor of linguistics at Stanford University, California, United States, and the main editor of the online journal Linguistic Issues in Language Technology.

Career 
Zaenen obtained her Ph.D. at Harvard University with her doctoral thesis Extraction Rules in Icelandic in 1980.  After a postdoc at MIT, she taught syntax at the University of Pennsylvania, Cornell University, and Harvard, before joining PARC and Stanford.  During the ‘90s, she was the manager of the Natural Language group of the Xerox Research Centre Europe in Grenoble, France. After Zaenen retired from PARC in 2011, she joined a research group on Language and Natural Reasoning at CSLI working on the linguistic encoding of temporal and spatial information, local textual inferences and natural logic.

She has worked on both the syntax of Germanic languages and on the development of Lexical Functional Grammar (LFG), with excursions into lexical semantics.  Her contributions to the theory of Lexical Functional Grammar are in the development of notions such as long-distance dependencies, functional uncertainty and the difference between subsumption and equality.  She had 27 scientific publications between 1996 and 2008. Zaenen is also known for her sharp commentary on research trends in Computational Linguistics. 

In 2013, Zaenen was honored by a Festschrift, edited by Tracy Holloway King and Valeria de Paiva.

Partial bibliography 
 Tense and aspect 
 Modern Icelandic syntax 
 Papers in lexical-functional grammar
 Subjects and other subjects
 Extraction rules in Icelandic 
 Architectures, rules, and preferences

References

External links 
 

1941 births
Living people
Linguists from the United States
Women linguists
Syntacticians
Harvard Graduate School of Arts and Sciences alumni
Scientists at PARC (company)